The Karkar language, also known as Yuri, is the sole Eastern Pauwasi language of Papua New Guinea. There are about a thousand speakers along the Indonesian border spoken in Green River Rural LLG, Sandaun Province.

Writing system

Dialects
Dialects are:
North Central Yuri dialect, spoken in Yuri village, Abaru ward, Green River Rural LLG
Auia-Tarauwi dialect, spoken in Auia (Auiya) village, Auiya 1 ward, Green River Rural LLG; and in Tarauwi (Trowari) village, Kambriap ward, Green River Rural LLG
Usari dialect, spoken in Usari village, Auiya 1 ward, Green River Rural LLG

Classification
Karkar-Yuri is not related to any other language in Papua New Guinea, and was therefore long thought to be a language isolate. This is the position of Wurm (1983), Foley (1986), and Ross (2005). However, Timothy Usher noticed that it is transparently related to the Pauwasi languages across the border in Indonesia. Indeed, it may even form a dialect continuum with the Eastern Pauwasi language Emem. This was foreshadowed in non-linguistic literature: a 1940 map shows the 'Enam' (Emem)–speaking area as including the Karkar territory in PNG, and the anthropologist Hanns Peter knew that the Karkar dialect continuum continued across the border into Emem territory.

Pauwasi cognates
Cognates between Karkar-Yuri and the Pauwasi family (Tebi and Zorop languages) listed by Foley (2018):

{| 
|+ Karkar-Yuri and Pauwasi family cognates
! gloss !! Tebi !! Zorop !! Karkar-Yuri
|-
| ‘I’ || na || nam || ɔn
|-
| ‘you (sg)’ || fro || nem || am
|-
| ‘we’ || numu || nim || nəm (incl)/yin (excl)
|-
| ‘belly’ || dialə || yalək || yare
|-
| ‘bird’ || olmu || awe || ant
|-
| ‘black’ || təŋəra || seŋgəri || yəkəre
|-
| ‘blood’ || təri || mob || yəri
|-
| ‘breast’ || mamu || muam || mɔm
|-
| ‘come’ || kəlawai || kwalopai || koʔrop
|-
| ‘eat’ || ne || fer- || fɨr
|-
| ‘eye’ || ei || ji || yi
|-
| ‘foot’ || puŋwa || fuŋi || pu
|-
| ‘give’ || taʔa || tipi || səp
|-
| ‘good’ || pani || kiap || kwapwe
|-
| ‘hand’ || təro || jae || yæ
|-
| ‘head’ || məndini || məndai || me
|-
| ‘hear’ || fei || fau || wao
|-
| ‘house’ ||  || nab || nap
|-
| ‘louse’ || mi || yemar || yəʔmər
|-
| ‘man’ || toŋkwar ||  || arɔp
|-
| ‘mosquito’ || mimi || yəŋkar || təʔnkarəp
|-
| ‘name’ || kini || jei || e
|-
| ‘road’ || fiaʔa || mai || mwæ
|-
| ‘root’ || periŋgu || fiŋgu || arak
|-
| ‘sand’ || tədən || gərək || kaʔrək
|-
| ‘tooth’ || kle || jurai || yu
|-
| ‘tree’ || weyalgi || war || yao
|-
| ‘water’ || ai || jewek || ənt
|-
| ‘who’ || mate || waunap || wao
|-
| ‘one’ || kərowali || aŋgətəwam || ankər
|-
| ‘two’ || kre || anəŋgar || anənk
|}

Pronouns
Pronouns listed by Ross (2005):

Object forms take -an, sometimes replacing the -o:  onan, amoan, man, yinan, námoan, yumoan.  Mao is a demonstrative 'that one, those'; it contrasts with nko, nkoan 'the other one(s)'.

Pronouns listed by Foley (2018) are:
{| 
|+ Karkar-Yuri pronouns
!  !! sg !! pl
|-
! 1incl
|  || nʌmɔ
|-
! 1excl
| ɔn || yin
|-
! 2
| amɔ || yumɔ
|-
! 3
| colspan="2" style="text-align: center;" | ma
|}

Phonology
The Karkar inventory is as follows.<ref>Dorothy Price, 1993. Organised Phonology Data: Karkar-Yuri Language [YUJ]: Green River – Sandaun Province</ref>

Stress assignment is complex, but not phonemic within morphemes. Syllable structure is CVC, assuming nasal–plosive sequences are analyzed as prenasalized consonants.

Vowels
Karkar has a vowel inventory consisting of 11 vowels, which is considered very high for a Papuan language.

There is also one diphthong, ao . Vowels are written á , é , ae , o , ou , ɨ .

Foley (2018) lists the 11 Karkar-Yuri vowels as:

Some vowel height contrasts in Karkar-Yuri (Foley 2018):ki ‘yam’kɨ ‘loosen’ku ‘cut crosswise in half’ke ‘edible nut’kər ‘put in netbag’ko ‘pig’kæ ‘egg’kʌʔr ‘swamp’kɔ ‘again’kar ‘speech’kɒ ‘bird species’

There are four contrasting central vowel heights:kɨr ‘red bird of paradise’ (Paradisaea rubra)kər ‘put in net bag’kʌʔr ‘swamp’kar ‘speech’

Consonants

The rhotics and glottal(ized) consonants do not appear initially in a word, and plain , the approximants, and the labialized consonants do not occur finally. Glottal stop only occurs finally. Plosives are voiced intervocalically. Phonemic labialized stops only occur in two words, apwar 'weeds, to weed' and ankwap 'another'. Otherwise consonants are labialized between a rounded and a front vowel, as in pok-ea  'going up'. In some words, the plosive of a final NC is silent unless suffixed: onomp  'my', onompono  'it's mine'.

Prenasalized and labialized consonant contrasts:pi ‘bird tail’, pwi ‘enough’, mporan ‘tomorrow’kar ‘voice’, ŋkɔte ‘over there’, kwar ‘ground’, ŋkwakwo ‘many kinds’

Plain and preglottalized sonorants contrasts, which only occur in word finals:ərər ‘sore’, ərəʔr ‘dig a hole’pan ‘sago flour’, pəʔn ‘blunt’

Basic vocabulary
Below are some basic vocabulary words in Karkar-Yuri.

{| 
|+ Karkar-Yuri basic vocabulary
| ‘I’ || ɔn
|-
| ‘you (sg)’ || am
|-
| ‘we’ || nəm (incl) / yin (excl)
|-
| ‘belly’ || yare
|-
| ‘bird’ || ant
|-
| ‘black’ || yəkəre
|-
| ‘blood’ || yəri
|-
| ‘breast’ || mɔm
|-
| ‘come’ || koʔrop
|-
| ‘eat’ || fɨr
|-
| ‘eye’ || yi
|-
| ‘foot’ || pu
|-
| ‘give’ || səp
|-
| ‘good’ || kwapwe
|-
| ‘hand’ || yæ
|-
| ‘head’ || me
|-
| ‘hear’ || wao
|-
| ‘house’ || nap
|-
| ‘louse’ || yəʔmər
|-
| ‘man’ || arɔp
|-
| ‘mosquito’ || təʔnkarəp
|-
| ‘name’ || e
|-
| ‘road’ || mwæ
|-
| ‘root’ || arak
|-
| ‘sand’ || kaʔrək
|-
| ‘tooth’ || yu
|-
| ‘tree’ || yao
|-
| ‘water’ || ənt
|-
| ‘who’ || wao
|-
| ‘one’ || ankər
|-
| ‘two’ || anənk
|}

Further reading
Price, Dorothy and Veda Rigden. 1988. Karkar-Yuri – English Dictionary. Unpublished manuscript. Ukarumpa, PNG: Summer Institute of Linguistics.
Rigden, Veda n.d. Karkar grammar essentials''. Unpublished manuscript. Ukarumpa: SIL-PNG.

References

East Pauwasi languages
Languages of Sandaun Province